Jack Alan McLoughlin (born 1 February 1995) is a retired Australian swimmer. He competed in the men's 1500 metre freestyle event at the 2016 Summer Olympics. At the 2018 Commonwealth Games McLoughlin won a gold medal in the same event and silver in the 400 metre freestyle. In the Autumn of 2019, he was a member of the inaugural International Swimming League swimming for the New York Breakers, who competed in the Americas Division.

McLoughlin won silver in the 400 metre freestyle at the 2020 Olympic Games in Tokyo. He was beaten into second place by 0.16 of a second.

Career
McLoughlin was only 18 years old when he competed at the 2013 Australian Youth Olympic Festival, winning gold in the 4 x 200m freestyle relay. He was placed fourth in the 1500 metre freestyle and 400 metre freestyle events. McLoughlin then competed in the 1500 metre freestyle at the Olympic Games in Rio de Janeiro, Brazil. At the 2017 World Championships in Budapest, Hungary, McLoughlin competed in marathon and freestyle swimming. For marathon, he placed twenty-third for the five kilometre and fourth for the five kilometre team relay.

At the 2018 Pan-Pacific Championships in Tokyo, Japan, McLoughlin competed in the 400 metre, 800 metre, and 1,500 metre freestyle events; he finished first in the 400 metre freestyle (3:44.20), third in the 800 metre freestyle (7:47.31), and fourth in the 1,500 metre freestyle (14:44.92). At the 2019 World Championships in Gwangju, Korea, McLoughlin competed in the 400 metre, 800 metre, 1,500 metre, and 4x200 metre freestyle events. He finished sixth in the 400 metre freestyle (3:45.19), fourth in the 800 metre freestyle (7:42.64), and first in the 4x200 metre freestyle.

References

External links
 

1995 births
Living people
Swimmers from Brisbane
Australian male freestyle swimmers
Commonwealth Games gold medallists for Australia
Commonwealth Games medallists in swimming
Commonwealth Games silver medallists for Australia
Olympic silver medalists for Australia
Olympic silver medalists in swimming
Olympic swimmers of Australia
Swimmers at the 2016 Summer Olympics
Swimmers at the 2018 Commonwealth Games
Swimmers at the 2020 Summer Olympics
Universiade medalists in swimming
Universiade silver medalists for Australia
World Aquatics Championships medalists in swimming
Medalists at the 2015 Summer Universiade
Medalists at the 2020 Summer Olympics
20th-century Australian people
21st-century Australian people
Sportsmen from Queensland
Medallists at the 2018 Commonwealth Games